is an officially licensed Formula One game developed by Bell Corporation and produced by Sega for the Sega Saturn. The game contains only three of the many Formula One circuits – Hockenheim, Monte Carlo, and Suzuka – while having another three based on the fictional Neo City, containing three different configurations.

While containing a full license (granted by FOCA, not the FIA) of the 1995 Formula One racing season with 13 teams and 26 drivers, the game only allows the player to play as five drivers: Michael Schumacher (Benetton), Damon Hill (Williams), Jean Alesi (Ferrari), Ukyo Katayama (Tyrrell), and Mika Häkkinen (McLaren). The other teams and drivers are in the game and the cars are correctly modeled but are unselectable.

Gameplay
The game is very similar to other titles produced by Sega. Its form is that of an arcade-style simulator that carries a variety of courses that range from easy to hard with a small selection of cars to choose from. This format has been followed by Sega games in the past, with such titles as Virtua Racing (1992), Daytona USA (1994), and Sega Touring Car Championship (1996). Unlike other racing titles released by Sega, F1 Challenge does not rely on powersliding and drifting, and instead attempts to be very simulator-oriented.

The game supports the Sega Arcade Racer steering wheel peripheral in addition to the standard Saturn controller.

Reception
Rad Automatic of Sega Saturn Magazine gave the game an 80%, calling it "ideal for race connoisseurs with a perfection complex", but inferior to Sega Rally Championship and Daytona USA as far as the average gamer is concerned. GamePros The Axe Grinder agreed that it was "More a hardcore racing game than a 'pop' arcade title", and that despite the above-average graphics the game feels bland and unexciting. He also criticized the weak A.I., generic rock soundtrack, and lack of sound effects. A reviewer for Next Generation praised the selection of real-life teams and tracks, but like Rad Automatic he felt it compared unfavorably to Sega Rally Championship and Daytona USA. He scored it three out of five stars.

Next Generation reviewed the Saturn version of the game, rating it four stars out of five, and stated that "in the end, this is a truly exceptional racing game."

References

External links
F1 Challenge at Sega Saturn UK – review, screens and information (archived)

1995 video games
Formula One video games
Sega Saturn games
Sega Saturn-only games
Multiplayer and single-player video games
Video games developed in Japan
Video games scored by Richard Jacques
Virgin Interactive games